Superior Collegiate and Vocational Institute (SCVI) is a high school in Thunder Bay, Ontario and is part of the Lakehead District School Board system. The school opened in September, 2009. It has approximately 600 students. It is also currently, as of September 2019, the only school in the Lakehead District School Board that offers the International Baccalaureate program, introduced in September 2018 after the shut down of Sir Winston Churchill Collegiate & Vocational Institute.

History

Superior Collegiate and Vocational Institute replaced Port Arthur Collegiate Institute and Hillcrest High School. Port Arthur Collegiate opened in 1909 and closed in 2007. Its students were then transferred to Hillcrest High School, which opened in 1928 as "Port Arthur Technical School". Hillcrest High School closed in 2009.

Construction of the school began in 2007. It was built on the former site of Balsam Street Public School, about a kilometre north of Hillcrest High School.

See also
List of high schools in Ontario
 Education in Thunder Bay, Ontario

References

External links 
 School website

High schools in Thunder Bay
Educational institutions established in 2009
2009 establishments in Ontario